The following is a list of rugby league players who have appeared for Canberra Raiders since the club's first league game in 1982.

NOTES:
 Name:
 Players are listed in the order of their debut game with the club.
 Players that debuted in the same game are added alphabetically.
 Appearances: Canberra Raiders games only, not a total of their career games. E.g. Luke Priddis has played a career total of 315 first-grade games but of those, 44 were at the Raiders.
 The statistics in this table are correct as of round 2 of the 2023 NRL season.

Players
Correct as of round 2 of the 2023 NRL season

External links
Canberra Raiders All Time First Grade Player List
Rugby League Tables / Canberra Raiders Point Scorers
RLP List of Players
RLP Canberra Raiders Transfers & Debuts

 
Lists of Australian rugby league players
National Rugby League lists
Canberra-related lists